Elisabetta Cocciaretto (born 25 January 2001) is an Italian professional tennis player.

She has been ranked by the Women's Tennis Association (WTA) as high as world No. 48 in singles, achieved on 16 January 2023, and No. 244 in doubles, which she attained on 10 August 2020.

Cocciaretto made her Billie Jean King Cup debut for Italy in 2018.

Juniors
On the ITF Junior Circuit, Cocciaretto had a career-high combined ranking of 17, achieved on 5 February 2018. She reached the semifinals of the 2018 Australian Open girls' singles tournament, losing to eventual champion Liang En-shuo.

Professional Career

2020: Grand Slam debut
She qualified for the first Grand Slam tournament main-draw in her career at the 2020 Australian Open.

2023: Maiden WTA final, top 50 debut, Italian No. 2
She reached her first WTA final at the 2023 Hobart International where she lost to Lauren Davis. As a result she reached the top 50 at world No. 48 on 16 January 2023 becoming the Italian female player No. 2 in the WTA rankings.

At the 2023 Mérida Open she reached the quarterfinals defeating Viktorija Golubic and Wang Xinyu.
The following week at the 2023 Monterrey Open she reached back to back quarterfinals defeating Marina Bassols Ribera and Tatjana Maria.

Performance timeline

Only main-draw results in WTA Tour, Grand Slam tournaments, Fed Cup/Billie Jean King Cup and Olympic Games are included in win–loss records.

Singles
Current after the 2023 Indian Wells Open

Doubles
Current after the 2023 Hobart International.

WTA career finals

Singles: 1 (runner-up)

Doubles: 1 (runner-up)

WTA Challenger finals

Singles: 3 (1 title, 2 runner-ups)

Doubles: 1 (title)

ITF Circuit finals

Singles: 9 (6 titles, 3 runner–ups)

Doubles: 1 (title)

Notes

References

External links
 
 
 

2001 births
Living people
Italian female tennis players
Tennis players at the 2018 Summer Youth Olympics